Chaman (also Romanized as Chamān) is a village in Dasht Rural District, Silvaneh District, Urmia County, West Azerbaijan Province, Iran. At the 2006 census, its population was 70, in 13 families.

References 

Populated places in Urmia County